The B9031 Road is a paved public highway in northern Aberdeenshire, Scotland. The roadway is notable for its proximity and access to a number of scenic, historic and prehistoric sites. for example the road provides access to the historic St. Drostan's Kirk. The road also provides proximity access to the prehistoric sites of Cairn Lee and Longman Hill.

See also
 Burn of Myrehouse
 Cairn Lee

Line notes

References
 Cuthbert Graham. 1977. Portrait of the Moray Firth
 C. Michael Hogan. 2008. Longman Hill, Modern Antiquarian 
 Richard D. Oram. 1997. Scottish prehistory, 243 pages
 N. H. Trewin, B. C. Kneller, Con Gillen. 1987. Excursion guide to the geology of the Aberdeen area, Geological Society of Aberdeen, 295 pages
 Philip's Motorists Atlas. 2004. Based on United Kingdom Ordnance Survey Map, Octopus Publishing Group Ltd.

Roads in Scotland
Transport in Aberdeenshire